The Amazing Race China 3 is the third instalment of the Chinese reality television series The Amazing Race China (Previously known as The Amazing Race). Based on the American reality TV series The Amazing Race, it features eight teams of two in a race around the world. Singapore based Chinese-American actor Allan Wu, who was also the host of The Amazing Race Asia and The Amazing Race: China Rush and episodes 3 to 10 of the first season and all of the episodes of the second season returned for this season.

The name was changed from The Amazing Race to The Amazing Race China from this season onwards, as shown on its clues. Infiniti left as the main sponsor to produce Race the World, with By-Health becoming the main sponsor for this season.

The season premiered on July 8, 2016 and concluded on September 16, 2016.

Married couple Guo Jingjing and Kenneth Fok (referred to in the show as Huo Qigang) were the winners of this season.

Production

Development and filming

Tapings for the series begin on April 18 in Beijing and ended on July 23 at Rio de Janeiro.

This season changed its name from The Amazing Race to The Amazing Race China, with the changing name shown on the clues and promotion for the show, and also adopting the American-style title sequence (based on Season 23) instead of a unique title card used for the first two seasons. All the cities visited in this series had hosted Summer Olympics, and the finale was set in the host city of 2016 Summer Olympics – Rio de Janeiro, Brazil. As such, the theme for the season was based on the Olympic Games.

Luo Xuejuan appeared as the Pit Stop greeter during Leg 1 in Athens, outside the stadium where she won a gold medal for women's 100 metre breaststroke at the 2004 Summer Olympics. Paralympic archer Antonio Rebollo, who lit the 1992 Summer Olympic flame during the opening ceremony by shooting a flaming arrow, appeared as a Pit Stop greeter during Leg 5.

In this season, two twists were renamed. The Save was renamed to Return Ticket and Versus was renamed to Face Off.

This is also the first season in The Amazing Race China that the Finish Line was not held in the home nation of China, and none of the eliminated teams were present at the Finish Line.

Marketing
This season featured brand new sponsors which were prominently featured in the show as well as on promotional material. In each leg, teams were able to pick up McDonald's food and Eastroc Super Drink at specific points, and the top three were given By-Health protein drinks at every Pit Stop once they were officially checked-in.

The show was also sponsored by Centaine, Bactroban and LiangMianZhen toothpaste.

Programming
A preview episode, sponsored by Centaine, was broadcast before the start of the episode, featuring a few minutes on the start of the leg, as well as snippets from the previous episode.

Similar to previous seasons, a two-part special season-end reunion/recap, Jin Xing Reviewing the Race, was aired a week after the season finale aired, on September 23 and 30, 2016. The show, hosted by Jin Xing (also a racer this season and host of The Jin Xing Show), discusses the top four of eight teams to review the season as a whole.

Cast
Similar to the first and second season, this season featured celebrities who were chosen to race on the show. Among which teams include a former Olympic diver, members from SNH48, and news anchors from Greater China Live. Taiwanese-American singer and former F4 members Wu Jianhao or Vanness Wu also involved in this season along with his sister, Yao Fengfeng or Melody.

Originally, Huang Jingyu and Xu Weizhou were cast, but were axed at the last minute for unknown reasons and were replaced by Season 1 racers Liu Chang & Jin Dachuan.

After Leg 2, upon the recommendation of doctors, Ji Longxiang (of Liu Xiang & Ji Longxiang) had to quit the show. Liu Xiang's partner and best friend Xu Qifeng replaced Ji starting on Leg 3.

Future appearances
SNH48 racer Huang Tingting would later appear during the first leg of the next season as a replacement to another racer, who was unable to attend the tapings on that time.

Results
The following teams participated in the season, each listed along with their placements in each leg and relationships as identified by the program. Note that this table is not necessarily reflective of all content broadcast on television, owing to the inclusion or exclusion of some data. Placements are listed in finishing order:

Key
A  team placement means the team was eliminated.
A  indicates that the team won a Fast Forward.
A  indicates that the team decided to use the first Express Pass on that leg. A  indicates the team had previously been given the second Express Pass and used it on that leg.
A  team placement indicates that the team came in last but was not eliminated.
An  team's placement indicates that the team came in last on a non-elimination leg and had to perform a Speed Bump during the next leg.
A  indicates that a team was brought back into the competition by means of the Return Ticket used on the previous leg.
A  indicates the team who received a U-Turn;  indicates that the team voted for the recipient.
An  next to a leg number indicates that there was a Face Off on that leg, while an  indicates the team that lost the Face Off and received a pre-determined time penalty.

Notes

 Liu Xiang originally entered the competition with his cousin Ji Longxiang. After Leg 2, it was determined that Ji was not medically fit to continue with the season. Starting on Leg 3, Ji was replaced by Liu's best friend Xu Qifeng.
 Jin Xing & Heinz used the Express Pass given to them by Liu Chang & Jin Dachuan bypass the Roadblock on Leg 3. Before using the Express Pass, Jin Xing elected to perform the Roadblock; this is reflected in the total Roadblock count.
 Liu Xiang & Xu Qifeng and Jin Xing & Heinz initially arrived 3rd and 5th respectively, but each teams were issued 30-minute penalties for quitting the sushi-eating task. Liu Xiang & Xu Qifeng's placement was not affected by the penalty, while the last two teams trailing Jin Xing & Heinz (Zhang Zhehan & Zhang Sifan and Wu Jianhao & Yao Fengeng) checked in during their penalty time, dropping Jin Xing & Heinz to last place; however, Zhang Zhehan & Zhang Sifan used their Return Ticket to save them from elimination.
 Wu Jianhao & Yao Fengfeng initially arrived 1st, but they were issued two penalties totaling 75 minutes (a 1-hour penalty for forfeiting the sushi challenge entirely and a 15-minute penalty for not completing the Fujiyama challenge correctly). Five teams checked-in during their penalty time, dropping Wu Jianhao & Yao Fengfeng to 6th.
 Liu Xiang & Xu Qifeng used their Express Pass to bypass the Detour on Leg 4.
 Zhang Zhehan & Zhang Sifan initially arrived 3rd, but were issued a 30-minute penalty for hiring private transportation during this leg, breaking a rule which prohibits hitch-hiking. Guo Jingjing & Huo Qigang checked-in during the penalty time, dropping Zhang Zhehan & Zhang Sifan to 4th.
 Huang Tingting & Sun Rui initially arrived 4th, but were issued a 30-minute penalty for crossing the red lights while on the way to the Military Edge Flower Detour. Zhang Zhehan & Zhang Sifan and Liu Xiang & Xu Qifeng checked-in during their penalty time, dropping Huang Tingting & Sun Rui to 6th. 
 Liu Xiang & Xu Qifeng were issued a 20-minute penalty for putting too many ingredients in their food at the paella task. 
 Huang Tingting & Sun Rui were issued a 10-minute penalty for not putting enough rice in their food at the paella task. 
 Jin Xing & Heinz were issued a 10-minute penalty for overcooking their food at the paella task. 
 Jin Xing & Heinz and Liu Xiang & Xu Qifeng initially arrived 2nd and 6th, respectively, but both teams were issued 1-hour penalties for quitting the Roadblock challenge. Liu Xiang & Xu Qifeng's placement were not affected by the penalty, while Liu Chang & Jin Dachuan and Guo Jingjing & Huo Qigang checked-in during Jin Xing & Heinz's penalty time, dropping them to 4th.
 Zhang Zhehan & Zhang Sifan initially arrived 5th, but were issued a 30-minute penalty for not wearing their sleeping caps while performing the Sleepwalker Detour challenge. This did not affect their placement.
 Huang Tingting & Sun Rui initially arrived 3rd, but were issued two penalties totaling 90 minutes (a 1-hour penalty for quitting the Roadblock challenge and a 30-minute penalty for not wearing their sleeping caps while performing the Sleepwalker Detour challenge). The last four teams trailing them checked-in during their penalty time, dropping Huang Tingting & Sun Rui to last place and resulting in their elimination.
 Wu Jianhao & Yao Fengfeng initially arrived 2nd, but were issued a 30-minute penalty as Wu Jianhao had walked past the permitted distance where team members are required to remain in-between each other, which was specifically prohibited by the rules. Guo Jingjing & Huo Qigang and Liu Chang & Jin Dachuan checked-in during their penalty time, dropping Wu Jianhao & Yao Fengfeng to last place and resulting in their elimination.
 Liu Xiang (of Liu Xiang & Xu Qifeng) elected to quit the final leg's Roadblock, but since they were the last team to arrive at the Finish Line, their 1-hour penalty were not issued.

Voting history
Similar to the Israeli, Australian and Philippine versions, teams on the fifth leg voted for who should receive the U-Turn. The team with the most votes had to complete the other option of the Detour they did not select.

Prizes 
The prize for each leg is awarded to the first place team for that leg.
Leg 1 – A deluxe dinner at the Hotel Grande Bretagne, a trip to Australia and New Zealand and two Express Passes.
Leg 2 – A Return Ticket and a trip to New Zealand and Australia.
Leg 3 – A trip to Norway, Denmark and Iceland.
Leg 4 – A trip to France, Germany and Switzerland.
Leg 5 – A trip to United States, United Kingdom and Brazil.
Leg 6 – A trip to Japan, South Korea and Singapore.
Leg 7 – A trip to Norway, Denmark, and Iceland.
Leg 8 – A trip to Denmark, Italy and Poland.
Leg 9 – A trip to United States, Switzerland and France.
Leg 10 – A pair of trophies and a  pearl necklace worth .

 An item that can be used to skip any one task of the team's choosing. The winning team keeps one for themselves but must relinquish the second to another team before the end of the fifth leg.
 An item which a team may use to bring back an eliminated team before the end of the fourth leg.

Race summary

Leg 1 (China → Greece)

Airdate: July 8, 2016
Beijing, China (Great Wall of China – Juyong Pass) (Starting Line)
Beijing (Beijing National Stadium) 
Beijing (Beijing Capital International Airport Terminal 3 – Turkish Airlines Lounge)
 Beijing (Beijing Capital International Airport) to Athens, Greece (Athens International Airport)
Argolis (Epidaurus) 
Athens (National and Kapodistrian University of Athens)
Athens (Athens Olympic Stadium)
Athens (Athens Olympic Stadium – Wall of Nations) 

In this season's first Roadblock, one team member would be hooked up to a harness and hoisted into the air, just like the dancers from the 2008 Summer Olympics opening ceremony. They then had to make five forward flips in the air while being raised upwards and five backwards flips while being lowered to receive their next clue.

In Archimedes, teams have to solve a 14-piece tangram to receive their next clue. If teams found their puzzle difficult to solve, they had to hike to the top of the amphitheatre where they would be given a scroll showing the placement of two pieces. In Spartan Warriors, teams had to complete javelin and discus throwing events. Both team members had to throw the discus beyond a specified line and hit a haybale with their javelin to receive their next clue.

Additional tasks
At Juyong Pass, teams had to run up the Great Wall, grab a flag from one of eight warriors and bring it back to the start to receive their next clue and Eastroc Super Drinks.
At the Turkish Airlines Lounge, teams had sign up for a departure time after landing in Greece, starting at 9:45 a.m. and continuing every three minutes, and could pick up McDonald's food.
At the National and Kapodistrian University of Athens, teams had to learn how to perform the changing of the guard routine of the Greek Presidential Guards known as Evzones. Under the supervision of the Presidential Guard, they had to perform the right choreography outside the hall to receive their next clue.
At the Athens Olympic Stadium, teams were presented with a board filled with Chinese Olympic athletes and various Olympic sports. From this selection, they had to pick out the only 10 gold medal winners and match them to their sport to receive their next clue.

Leg 2 (Greece → Germany)

Airdate: July 22, 2016
Athens (Hotel Grande Bretagne) (Pit Start)
 Athens (Athens International Airport) to Munich, Bavaria, Germany (Munich Airport)
Munich (Englischer Garten – Chinesischer Turm)
Munich (St. Peter's Church – Alter Peter Tower)
 Garmisch-Partenkirchen (Große Olympiaschanze)
Garmisch-Partenkirchen (Bräustüberl Garmisch)  
 Garmisch-Partenkirchen (Mohrenplatz or Werdenfelser Hof)
 Saulgrub (Forsthaus Unternogg)
Schwangau (Bullachberg Castle  overlooking Neuschwanstein Castle) 

In this leg's first Roadblock, one team member had to ride a zip-line and match a ski pose to receive their next clue.

For their Speed Bump, Zhang Meixi & Zang Yafei had to make and eat ten white sausage of the same size before they could continue racing.

In Cheers, teams had to carry twenty-two full steins of beer through the Mohrenplatz and carefully deliver them all at once through the crowd without dropping any of them or spilling more than six of them past a line on the stein to receive their next clue. In Revelry, teams had to learn and correctly perform the Schuhplattler, a traditional Bavarian dance, to receive their next clue.

In this leg's second Roadblock, the team member who did not perform the previous Roadblock had to learn a Bavarian love song at the log house and then serenade their partner while perched on a ladder. If they could pronounce the words correctly and stay on key, they would receive their next clue. If they were incorrect, a bucket of water would be dumped on them and they would have to start over.

Additional tasks
At Englischer Garten, each team had to pick a dachshund, then every team had to race with their dachshunds along a course. The first team to finish the course would receive a stuffed toy Waldi listing the location of their next clue, whereas the remaining teams had to wait for the next race. The last losing team would have to wait for five minutes before they could continue racing.
At St. Peter's Church, teams had to climb 306 steps to the top of the Alter Peter Tower and search for one of eight marked cars below with their next clue.

Leg 3 (Germany → Japan)

Airdate: July 29, 2016
 Munich (Munich Airport) to Tokyo, Japan (Haneda Airport) via China
Tokyo (Minato – Odaiba Seaside Park) (Pit Start)
Tokyo (Minato – Star Rise Tower Studio ) 
Tokyo (Kōtō – SIM Studio) 
 Tokyo (Chiyoda – Maidreamin or Shinjuku – Shinjuku Central Park)
Fujiyoshida (Fuji-Q Highland) 
 Susono (Fuji Safari Park)
Fujikawaguchiko (Yagizaki Park) 

In Sailor Moon, one team member had to dress as a character from series at the Maidreamin maid café. Then, teams had to search for a man dressed as the character Tuxedo Mask around the Shibuya Crossing to receive their next clue. In Case Closed, teams had to travel to a forensics training facility. There, teams had to locate ten pieces of bones and teeth inside a simulated crime scene, mark each spot with a flag, measure the locations, and correctly graph each piece to scale on an evidence sheet to receive their next clue from a crime scene analyst.

In this leg's Roadblock, one team member had to dress as a ninja and complete three ninja training courses (scaling a wall, navigating a rope course, and throwing a shuriken) to receive their next clue.

Additional tasks
At Star Rise Tower Studio, teams had to participate in a Japanese-style game show called "Wasabi Boom Boom". After the arrival of the first team, the host would spin a wheel containing 18 stands with temaki, two which had two "wasabi bombs" (temaki-style sushi filled only with hot wasabi). If teams received the wasabi bombs, both team members had to eat one within two minutes to receive their next clue. If teams failed to finish within the time allotted, they had to play again until they received new wasabi bombs. If teams received a plain temaki, one team member had to eat it and play until they received the wasabi bombs.
At SIM Studio, teams had to learn how to execute five Judo techniques to receive their next clue.
At Fuji-Q Highland, teams had to ride Fujiyama and spot three people holding signs along the ride that, when combined, formed their next destination. Once the ride was complete, they had to tell the park manager what message they saw to receive their next clue; otherwise, they would have to ride the rollercoaster again.

Leg 4 (Japan → Russia)

Airdate: August 5, 2016
 Tokyo (Narita International Airport) to Moscow, Russia (Domodedovo International Airport)
Moscow (Swissôtel Krasnye Holmy) (Pit Start)
Moscow (Maly Krasnokholmsky Bridge)
 Moscow ( Bakery)
 Moscow (Slavyanskaya Square)
 Moscow (Moscow Circus on Tsvetnoy Boulevard)
  Moscow (Russian State Social University Swimming Pool or Korston Club Hotel)
Moscow (Moscow State Pedagogical University) 
Moscow (Red Square overlooking Saint Basil's Cathedral) 

In this season's only Fast Forward, teams had to travel by taxi to the Moscow Circus on Tsvetnoy Boulevard and change into costumes. Then, one team member had to walk with a spinning plate to their partner, who had to bring back to the start. Once complete, both team members had to perform a four-part aerial routine. The first team to complete both routines would win the Fast Forward award (a Saint Basil's Cathedral figurine).

In Hibiscus Out of Water, teams had to learn and perform a synchronized swimming routine with six other swimmers of the Russian national developmental team to the satisfaction of a judge to receive their next clue. In Military Edge Flower, teams had to dress up as Russian soldiers and to learn and perform the steps of the Trepak dance to the satisfaction of a judge to receive their next clue.

In this leg's Roadblock, one team member was shown a brief slideshow showing the time and time zone of either Los Angeles, Rio de Janeiro or London, a map of Russia's nine different time zones with their UTC offsets and the same Russian time zone map without the UTC offsets but with several other Russian cities highlighted. After the show, they had to fill in the corresponding local times for any five cities within an allotted time period to receive their next clue. If they were wrong or ran out of time, they had to watch the presentation and do the quiz again.

Additional tasks
At the Maly Krasnokholmsky Bridge, each racer had to drink a glass of vodka, which was balanced on a sabre, to receive their next clue.
At the bakery, teams had to transfer 20 bags of flour from a truck to a marked area to receive their next clue.

Leg 5 (Russia → China → Spain)

Airdate: August 12, 2016
 Moscow (Sheremetyevo International Airport) to Zhuhai, Guangdong, China (Zhuhai Jinwan Airport)
Zhuhai (By-Health Production Factory)
 Zhuhai (Jiuzhou Port) to Chek Lap Kok, Islands District, Hong Kong (Skypier)
 Chep Lap Kok (Hong Kong International Airport) to Barcelona, Spain (Barcelona–El Prat Airport)
El Prat de Llobregat (Barcelona–El Prat Airport Arrival Terminal)
Barcelona (Plaza de Gaudí  overlooking Sagrada Família) 
 Barcelona (Gran Teatre del Liceu or Port Vell) 
Barcelona (Mirador de Colom) 
Barcelona (Mercat de la Barceloneta)
Barcelona (The Serras Hotel Barcelona)
 Mollet del Vallès (Camp de Tir Olímpic de Mollet) 
Barcelona (Estadi Olímpic Lluís Companys) 

For their Speed Bump, Jin Xing & Heinz had to each don a traditional Spanish giant costume and walk around the whole plaza before they could continue racing.

In Torero, teams had to make their way to the Gran Teatre del Liceu, watch a medley of songs from the opera Carmen, and then each team member had to correctly answer a quester about details of opera to receive their next clue. In Sleepwalker, teams had to make their way to Port Vell, where each team member had to don a sleeping hat and carry a bed to the starting line. If either the teams or the bed touches the ground during the task, teams had to ask other locals to help before they could continue.

In this leg's Roadblock, teams had to make their way to Camp de Tir Olímpic de Mollet, where one team member had to use a shotgun to shoot down five clay targets to receive their next clue. Each round had five shots, and racers' scores carried over to the next round.

Additional tasks
At the Pit Stop hotel in Zhuhai, teams had to vote for which team they wished to U-Turn.
At the By Health Production Factory, teams had to search the building with 100 mascots for the ones from the 12 most recent Summer Olympic Games and place them in the corresponding shelves of the host cities. The correct answers were:
{| class="wikitable"
! Year
! City
! Mascot
! Year
! City
! Mascot
|-
! 1972
| Munich
| Waldi
! 1996
| Atlanta
| Izzy
|-
! 1976
| Montreal
| Amik
! 2000
| Sydney
| Olly, Syd and Millie
|-
! 1980
| Moscow
|  Misha
! 2004
| Athens
| Athena and Phevos
|-
! 1984
| Los Angeles
|  Sam
! 2008
| Beijing
|  Fuwa
|-
! 1988
| Seoul
|  Hodori
! 2012
| London
|  Wenlock
|-
! 1992
| Barcelona
|  Cobi
! 2016
| Rio
|  Vinicius
|}
Once the mascots were placed in the correct shelves, they could receive their next clue as well as their flight tickets. The first four teams received their tickets on the first flight, while the remaining teams would take the second flight.
After landing in Spain, teams had to search the airport arrivals terminal for their next clue.
At Mercat de la Barceloneta, teams had to memorize and purchase the ingredient listed at the entrance written in Spanish to learn their next destination.
At the Serras Hotel Barcelona, teams had to make paella by following the steps listed and then consume it to receive their next clue. However, teams would receive a 10-minute penalty per every missteps made.

Leg 6 (Spain → Italy)

Airdate: August 19, 2016
 Barcelona (Barcelona–El Prat Airport) to Rome, Italy (Leonardo da Vinci–Fiumicino Airport)
Rome (Crowne Plaza Rome - St. Peter's) (Pit Start)
Rome (Trevi Fountain)
 Rome (Pinacoteca del Tesoriere)
Rome (Parco del Celio)
Rome (Stadio delle Terme di Caracalla) 
 Rome (Piazza Navona or Parco Lineare Integrato delle Mura)
Rome (Ponte Sant'Angelo) 

In this leg's Roadblock, one team member had to choose a mask and then search through a masquerade ball for a guest wearing exactly the same mask to receive their next clue.

For this season's first Face Off, teams competed in three Olympic track and field events: 110 metres hurdles, racewalking and long jump. Each team member had to compete in at least one event. The first team to win two events would receive their next clue while the losing team had to wait for another team. The last team had to wait for an hourglass to empty before they could continue racing.

In Roman Numerals, teams had to count three specific things in Piazza Navona: the number of balloons attached to a vendor's bike (56), the number of bearded men on the three fountains' statues (14) and the number of paintings from four art vendors that depicted events from previous legs (28). Using the numbers given, they then had to write the numbers into a provided equation [(56 + 14) x 28], then solve it (1960 – referencing the 1960 Summer Olympics in Rome) and write the answer in Roman numerals (MCMLX) to receive their next clue. In Roman Trebuchet, teams had to use all provided parts to build a fully functional trebuchet and launch a cannonball past a marked line to receive their next clue.

Additional tasks
At Trevi Fountain, teams had to make a wish using a provided 1 euro coin and then find a pair of Gregory Peck and Audrey Hepburn from Roman Holiday impersonators, who would give them their next clue and a puzzle box. 
At Parco del Celio, teams had to choose a gladiator who would teach them how to perform a staged gladiator fight. When facing off against the champion gladiator, the first team member had to lose their match, while the other team member had to win. When the emperor was satisfied with their performance, teams would receive their next clue.
Each clue envelope during the leg contained letters ('L,' 'E,' 'N,' 'G' and 'A'), and teams would need to unlock the puzzle box which contained the Pit Stop clue by unscrambling the letters to spell out "ANGEL".
Teams had to figure out how to read the final clue which revealed the location of the Pit Stop, but was written in reverse.

Leg 7 (Italy → United States)

Airdate: August 26, 2016
 Rome (Leonardo da Vinci–Fiumicino Airport) to Los Angeles, California, United States (Los Angeles International Airport) via China
Marina del Rey (Burton Chace Park) (Pit Start)
 Marina del Rey (Mother's Beach)
Los Angeles (Dolby Theatre)
 Los Angeles (Griffith Park – Bronson Caves)
Universal City (Universal Studios Lot)
 Los Angeles (Loyola Marymount University – Burns Recreation Center or Gersten Pavilion)
Santa Monica (Santa Monica Beach) 

In this leg's Roadblock, one team member had to climb a rope ladder to a hanging platform. They then walked onto a beam from which they had to jump off and grab both halves of a hanging clue. If they failed to grab either one or both halves, they would need to climb up the ladder for another attempt.

In Mid Court, teams had to learn and perform a Laker Girls cheerleading routine set to the tune of "Mickey" to receive the next clue. In Full Court, teams had to complete an NBA official skill challenge, where both team members had to perform an alley-oop, dribble through an obstacle course, perform a bounce pass into a vertical hoop and perform a free throw and a 3-point shot at the side of the hoop, within four minutes to receive the next clue.

Additional tasks
At Burton Chace Park, teams had to pedal a water bike through the marina to Mother's Beach, where they would pick up their vehicles for the leg.
In front of Dolby Theatre, teams had to assemble a replica of an Oscar award using a set of Lego bricks to receive a fake Oscar with the address of their next clue printed on the bottom.
At the Universal Studios Lot, teams had to dress up and memorize a script for a Western action movie. One team member played the part of a cowboy named Bill, while the other played the part of the damsel in distress Rose. Teams had to correctly follow the script including English dialogue, stunt fighting and falls, gun-slinging and falls and a final explosion to receive their next clue from the director.

Leg 8 (United States)

Airdate: September 2, 2016
 Los Angeles (Los Angeles International Airport) to Atlanta, Georgia (Hartsfield–Jackson Atlanta International Airport)
Atlanta (Centennial Olympic Park – SkyView Atlanta) (Pit Start)
Villa Rica (Stockmar Airport)
Tallapoosa (West GA Mud Park) 
 Atlanta (Abrams Fixture Corporation or Blind Willie's Blues Bar)
Stone Mountain (Stone Mountain Park Plantation Meadow)
Stone Mountain (Stone Mountain Summit) 

For this leg's Face Off, one team member from each team would ride in a monster truck while holding a large container of water collected and given to them by their partner. Racers to keep as much water as they can in the container during the monster truck course. The team who lost the least amount of water would receive the next clue while the losing team had to wait for another team. The last team had to wait for an hourglass to empty before they could continue racing.

In Color, which only had three stations, teams had to correctly re-create a piece of local graffiti art to the satisfaction of the artist to receive their next clue. In Beat, teams had to learn and sing "Wang Dang Doodle", an English-language blues song, to the satisfaction of the audience to receive their next clue.

Additional tasks
At SkyView Atlanta, one team member would be harnessed to a net connected to the Ferris Wheel's support beams, while the other would seated inside one of the capsules. When the wheel was in motion, team members had to grab four ribbons with math equations surrounding the net's frame. The equations and/or the answers would be relayed to their teammate who was in the next capsule on the Ferris Wheel. Two of the answers to those math equations were the codes needed to unlock a briefcase, which contained their next clue.
At Stockmar Airport, one team member would be flown in a small airplane and, with their partner guiding them via walkie-talkie on the ground, had to drop flour bombs onto two targets to receive their next clue. Only one team could be in the air at a time and each team had four flour bombs for each attempt.
At Stone Mountain Park Plantation Meadow, teams had to score 100 cumulative points in archery. Each team member would get six arrows and two rounds to use them within four minutes.

Leg 9 (United States → Mexico)

Airdate: September 9, 2016
 Atlanta (Hartsfield–Jackson Atlanta International Airport) to Mexico City, Mexico (Mexico City International Airport) via China
Mexico City (Mexican Olympic Committee Headquarters – Mexican Olympic Sports Center) (Pit Start)  
 Mexico City (National Museum of Anthropology)
Mexico City (Mercado de San Juan) 
Mexico City (Plaza Garibaldi and Escuela de Mariachi Ollin Yoliztli Garibaldi)
 San Martín Centro, Mexico (Cactus Farm)
San Juan Teotihuacán (Jardin de las Cactaceas) 

In a combined Intersection and Face Off, the winning team from the previous leg determined the team pair-ups to compete in a 4 × 100 metres relay race. The losing Intersected teams would serve a 15-minute penalty while the winning teams would continue racing. Afterwards, teams were no longer Intersected.

In this leg's first Roadblock, teams had to travel to the National Museum of Anthropology and find a group of performers called the Voladores de Papantla. Then, one team member had to climb a  pole and swing around the pole suspended on ropes to the ground for five minutes to receive their next clue.

For their Speed Bump, Liu Chang & Jin Dachuan had to make acceptable 20 tortillas before they could continue racing.

In this leg's second Roadblock, the team member who did not perform the previous Roadblock had to put on a dress made of balloons, follow a marked path through a field of cacti and find a sombrero, which they would exchange for their next clue. However, teams would receive a penalty based on how many balloons popped or were missing from the dress.

Additional tasks
At Mercado de San Juan, each team member had to eat one bowl of fried insects and peppers, each with varying degrees of pungency, to receive their next clue.
At Plaza Garibaldi, teams had to search among 350 Mariachi performers for one who was faking their performance of "Cielito Lindo" and take the performer to a judge to receive their next clue and a Snickers candy bar.
At Jardin de las Cactaceas, teams had to properly assemble a puzzle of a Mesoamerican mask to receive an embroidered map directing them to the Pit Stop, which they had to search for on foot.

Leg 10 (Mexico → Brazil)

Airdate: September 16, 2016
 Mexico City (Mexico City International Airport) to Rio de Janeiro, Brazil (Rio de Janeiro/Galeão International Airport)
Rio de Janeiro (Hilton Rio de Janeiro Copacabana) (Pit Start)
Rio de Janeiro (Copacabana Beach)
Rio de Janeiro (Vidigal – Casa Alto Vidigal)
Rio de Janeiro (Ipanema Beach)
Rio de Janeiro (Urca – Praia Vermelha )  
Rio de Janeiro (Escadaria Selarón)
Rio de Janeiro (Flamengo Beach) 

In this season's final Roadblock, one team member had to ride a wakeboard around a course in the water until they could reach and touch a yellow ramp without falling off to receive their next clue.

Additional tasks
At Copacabana Beach, each team member had to drink a glass of fresh cherry juice to reveal the number of the van, which was on the bottom of one of the two glasses, with their next clue that they would be using for the duration of the leg.
At Casa Alto Vidigal, teams had to correctly prepare five churrasco skewers, each containing different types of meat, according to a provided example. When their skewers were approved by the chef, teams would be given a plate that they had to finish to receive their next clue.
On Ipanema Beach, teams had play footvolley against a pair of local professionals. While the pros could not use their hands, the teams could. If teams could score eight points before the pros scored 21, they would receive their next clue. 
At Escadaria Selarón, teams had to search for one of three The Amazing Race China tiles which they needed to present to a samba dancer at the bottom of the steps. The dancer would then lead teams to a changing area and teach them some simple samba steps. Teams would then need to find people who would like to join them in a parade with each person holding a colored feather corresponding to their samba ensemble's clothing. When they reached the corner of R. Teotônio Regadas and Rua da Lapa streets, a samba dancer in a silver outfit would collect the feathers. When teams were able to produce 20 feathers from their parade participants, they would be given their next clue.
At Flamengo Beach, teams had to map out their racecourse by looping a rope through a series of rings attached to a large map, with each ring representing a different city. Then, teams had to search among hundreds of bottles buried in the sand for the ten containing the flags of each country they visited and place them on the map. Teams could only bring back two bottles at a time and if incorrect, had to properly bury the bottles back in the sand. Once the mapped-out route and the flags were correct, teams would receive their final clue.

Notes

References

External links
 Shenzhen TV Official Website
 Sina Weibo

China 3
2016 Chinese television seasons
Television shows filmed in China
Television shows filmed in Greece
Television shows filmed in Germany
Television shows filmed in Russia
Television shows filmed in Spain
Television shows filmed in Italy
Television shows filmed in California
Television shows filmed in Georgia (U.S. state)
Television shows filmed in Mexico
Television shows filmed in Brazil